Joannes Josephus van Mulken  (29 July 1796 – 21 October 1879) was a Dutch military officer and Secretary of War.

See also
List of Dutch politicians

1796 births
1879 deaths
Ministers of Foreign Affairs of the Netherlands
Ministers of War of the Netherlands
Members of the House of Representatives (Netherlands)
Members of the Council of State (Netherlands)
Independent politicians in the Netherlands
Royal Netherlands Army generals
Royal Netherlands Army officers
Dutch military personnel of the Napoleonic Wars
Knights Fourth Class of the Military Order of William
Commanders of the Order of the Netherlands Lion
Graduates of the Koninklijke Militaire Academie
People from Kampen, Overijssel